Varberg Hospital (Swedish: Varbergs Sjukhus) is a hospital in Varberg, Sweden. The hospital was completed in 1972, as a replacement of the old hospital in the city. After that, the old hospital was demolished. Varberg Hospital has 450 beds for general medical care and 350 beds for psychiatric treatment.

History

References 

Hospital buildings completed in 1972
Hospitals in Sweden
Buildings and structures in Varberg